Singer Lake is a lake in Berrien County, in the U.S. state of Michigan.

Singer Lake has the name of Samuel Singer, a pioneer who settled at the lake in 1836.

References

Lakes of Berrien County, Michigan